The Sabeto Roosters Rugby League Club (SRRLC) is rugby league franchise based in Koroyaca Village, Sabeto in Nadi. The SRRLC has teams competing in all grades of the Fiji National Rugby League Competition annually.

The club has so far won 3 Super Eight Championship titles, 2 Reserve Grade Titles, 1 Under Eighteen Title and 1 U16 Title.

Founding 
SRRLC was founded in 1992 at Erenavula House in Sabeto by a group of rugby league players who represented Fiji on the Fiji Bati Australia Tour.

Establishment 
SRRLC was later established and became fully a recognised rugby league club in 2008 after successfully registering the club to the Fiji National Rugby League office in Suva. The club is yet to register as a company to pursue is business development goals projected in the Club charter.

Organisation Structure 
Sabeto Rugby League Club is owned by the Patron (who is the Paramount King of Sabeto District, Fiji) and Managed by the Management Board consisting the Club President, Club Manager & his assistant, Treasurer, Secretary & Administrator. Below the Patron, the President of the Club Chairs the General Meetings on His behalf and presides in those meeting. Each team under the club banner has its own respective Team Managers that manage individual teams during the annual championships.

Fiji National Rugby League Championship Achievements 
 2015 - Top 8 Premier Champion
 2015 - Premier Nines Champion
 2015 - Under 16 Champion
 2014 - Reserved Grade Champion
 2014 - Under 18 Champion
 2013 - Top 8 Premier Champion
 2011 - Under 18 Champion
 2010 - Top 8 Premier Champion

2015 Top 8 Squad 
 Head coach: Mr. Poate Naravu
 Assistant coach: Mr. Apete Bogitini
 Players:
 Tevita Niusama
 Isaac Tunikula
 Semisi Qoro
 Kolinio Radrovi
 Ulaiasi Radrovi
 Iliesa Saulaca
 Peceli Teitei
 Savenaca Naovuka
 Roger Qoro
 Inia Toka
 Tomasi Navunilagi
 Sanaila Lomawai
 Viliame Rakuli
 Ilami Susu
 Wasiki Ramatau
 Veniasi Senikarawa
 Jone Wainiqolo
 Timoci Naloto Saukuru 
 Joshua Tuqiri

Current Management Board 
 Patron: RATU Tevita Susu Mataitoga
 President: Taniela Naika
 Secretary & Sponsorships: Don Natabe
 Treasurer: Josaia Qoro
 General manager: RATU Viliame Mataitoga
 Board Members:
 Poate Naravu
 Setareki Rika
 RATU Josaia Nabukatavatava
 Emitai Malomalo
 Saimoni Bok
 Apete Bogitini
 Sakiusa Naravu
 Marika Lewaqai
RATU Kaliova Lumuni

Consortium of Sponsors by Year 
2015 Consortium
Corporate Freight Ltd
HD Enterprise Ltd
HENRY ROBINSON
ALL Engineering Ltd
Naboutini Transport Ltd
BIBI Nasilasila
Boladuadua Trust
Swamy Diary Shop
P.S Nagar & Sons Ltd
TAU Sports
CGnex Ltd
DRUA Ltd
Anil Singh
Sabeto Mudpools Ltd
TIFAJEK Hotsprings Ltd
Koroiaca Womens Society
Kadar Buksh Ltd
Tropikkana Events & Equipment Hire

See also

Fiji National Rugby League Competition
Fiji women's national rugby league team
Rugby league in Fiji
Fiji national rugby league team

References

External links

Fijian rugby league teams
Rugby clubs established in 1990
Ba Province